This is a list of Asian Canadian writers.

A
Ken Adachi
Kamal Al-Solaylee

B
Sharon Bala
Shauna Singh Baldwin
Himani Bannerji
Kaushalya Bannerji
Gurjinder Basran
Ven Begamudré
H. S. Bhabra
Navtej Bharati
Sadhu Binning
Eddy Boudel Tan

C
Jolan Chang
Cheng Sait Chia
Ins Choi
Denise Chong
Kevin Chong
Wayson Choy
Ook Chung
Adrienne Clarkson

D
Farzana Doctor

E
Winnifred Eaton

F
Tarek Fatah
Dennis Foon

G
C. E. Gatchalian
Shree Ghatage
Hiromi Goto

H
Tara Singh Hayer
Ray Hsu

J
Ramin Jahanbegloo

K
Michael Kaan
Surjeet Kalsey
M. J. Kang
Roy Kiyooka
Michelle Kim
Joy Kogawa
Lydia Kwa

L
Larissa Lai
Thao Lam
Vincent Lam
Evelyn Lau
JJ Lee
Jen Sookfong Lee
Nancy Lee
Pat Lee
Sky Lee
Nanda Lwin

M
Deepa Mehta
Roy Miki
Rohinton Mistry
Shani Mootoo
Bharati Mukherjee, now a U.S. citizen

N
Zarqa Nawaz

O
Michael Ondaatje
Ruth Ozeki

P
Leah Lakshmi Piepzna-Samarasinha

Q
Andy Quan

R
Gurcharan Rampuri
Ian Iqbal Rashid
Anita Rau Badami
Ajmer Rode

S
Michelle Sagara
Kerri Sakamoto
Shyam Selvadurai
Sheung-King
Tetsuro Shigematsu
Aki Shimazaki
Nasir Siddiki
Jaspreet Singh
Sun Bo

T
Souvankham Thammavongsa
Yasuko Thanh
Madeleine Thien
Kim Thúy
Ayelet Tsabari

U
Priscila Uppal

V
M.G. Vassanji
Padma Viswanathan
Caroline Vu

W
Fred Wah
Terry Watada
Jan Wong
Lindsay Wong
Rita Wong
Jim Wong-Chu

X
Xiaowen Zeng

Y
David Yee
Paul Yee
Ying Chen
Jean Yoon

Z
Joe Zee

References

Lists of Canadian writers